The Burkinabé Football Federation is the governing body of football in Burkina Faso. Their offices are based in the capital city of Ouagadougou. The president of the federation is Sita Sangaré.

History
It was founded in 1959 and affiliated to FIFA and to CAF in 1964. It organizes the national football league and the national team.

Staff
President: Sita Sangaré,
Vice President: Laurent Blaise Kaboré
General Secretary: Boureima Balima
Treasurer: Idrissa Kafando
Technical Director: Ousmane Savadogo
Men's Coach:  [Paulo Duarte]
Media Officer:	Gabriel Nacoulma
Referee Coordinator: David Yaméogo

References

External links
 

Burkina Faso
Sports governing bodies in Burkina Faso
Football in Burkina Faso
Sports organizations established in 1960